The Narrows is the 14th novel by American crime author Michael Connelly, and the tenth featuring the Los Angeles detective Hieronymus "Harry" Bosch.  As Bosch crosses paths with FBI Agent Rachel Walling, the novel ties story elements left unresolved in The Poet and those from Blood Work and A Darkness More Than Night together into the Bosch mythos.

Plot summary
While investigating the death of ex-FBI profiler Terry McCaleb at his wife's request, Bosch begins to suspect that notorious serial killer and ex-FBI supervisor Robert Backus, aka The Poet, presumed dead, may have murdered McCaleb.  Digging deeper, Bosch follows a lead to Las Vegas that brings him into contact with the FBI.  Meanwhile, FBI agent Rachel Walling, who was at one time Backus's protégé in the FBI (as McCaleb had also been) and who has been exiled by the FBI to South Dakota for four years for her role in The Poet investigation, is the subject of messages sent by Backus to the FBI.  As Bosch and Walling are both outsiders to the main FBI investigation, they eventually join forces. The novel shifts points of view, cutting from Bosch's first-person commentary to the third-person perspectives of Walling and Backus.  Bosch meets a neighbor whom he later discovers (in the book The Closers) to be Cassie Black, the main character of Void Moon, and he begins a relationship with Walling.  He also accepts an offer from his old partner Kiz Rider to rejoin the LAPD under a new chief of police, as a homicide detective in the Open-Unsolved Unit within the department's Robbery-Homicide Division.

In the end, Bosch and Walling bring The Poet to justice by chasing him into the concrete channels of the swollen Los Angeles River in L.A., where he drowns while Bosch barely survives.  His death is confirmed this time, as opposed to The Poet where he was merely presumed dead.  However, the relationship between Bosch and Walling falls apart in the end when Bosch learns that the FBI had discovered that Backus had nothing to do with McCaleb's death but had withheld the information from him.  In fact, McCaleb had killed himself in a manner to make his death look accidental, as his heart transplant was failing, and he did not want to burden his wife and children with the crippling expense of additional medical procedures.

2004 American novels
Harry Bosch series
Novels set in Los Angeles
Little, Brown and Company books